Paul Temple is a fictional character created by English writer Francis Durbridge. Temple is a professional author of crime fiction and an amateur private detective. With his wife Louise, affectionately known as 'Steve' in reference to her journalistic pen name 'Steve Trent', he solves whodunnit crimes through subtle, humorously articulated deduction. Always the gentleman, the strongest expletive he employs is "by Timothy!".

Created for the BBC radio serial Send for Paul Temple in 1938, the Temples featured in more than 30 BBC radio dramas, twelve serials for German radio, four British feature films, a dozen novels, and a BBC television series. A Paul Temple daily newspaper strip ran in the London Evening News for two decades.

Overview
Paul Temple was a professional novelist. While he possessed no formal training as a detective, his background in constructing crime plots for his novels enabled him to apply deductive reasoning to solve cases whose solution had eluded Scotland Yard.

Over the course of each case, Temple eschewed formal interviews or other police techniques, in favour of casual conversations with suspects and witnesses. Yet even this informal style of investigation invariably precipitated attempts by the suspects to hamper him, through traps, ambushes, even assassination attempts. Always surviving these, Temple would arrange a cocktail party or similar social event at which he unmasked the perpetrator.

At the end of each tale, Paul, Steve and Sir Graham Forbes held a post mortem. Here, Paul explained why certain events in the serial took place, which of these had been red herrings, and which had been genuine clues. Some elements of the plot had already been explained during the serial, while others were occasionally never fully explained, due to limitations of time and deficiencies in the writer’s ability to plot. In general, the serials feature similar types of events, often in the same sequence.

Works

Original radio serials

The Paul Temple characters and formula were developed in a succession of BBC Radio serials broadcast between 1938 and 1968, with several radio actors portraying the Temples.  After the war the character was played by a succession of different actors: Barry Morse (1945), Howard Marion-Crawford (1946) and Kim Peacock (1946–1951). The longest-running team, and the most popular with audiences, was Peter Coke (pronounced Cooke) and Marjorie Westbury, who starred together in every serial made between 1954 and 1968; Westbury had played the role in every serial aired between 1945 and 1954.

The radio series was a collaboration between writer Francis Durbridge and BBC producer Martyn C Webster, both of whom worked all of the radio broadcasts aired over the thirty years from 1938 to 1968. Durbridge was still at college when he approached Webster, who was then with the BBC Midland Region, with his proposal for a mystery series about a gentleman detective.

Initially the serials were broadcast on the service in the BBC Midlands Region service. As they gained in popularity, they were aired nationally instead on the Home Service. However, in 1945, they found a new permanent home on the Light Programme, which too was a national station, where they remained (save for occasional repeats on the Home Service) until the last serial in 1968. The introductory and closing music for the majority of the serials was Coronation Scot, composed by Vivian Ellis, though the earliest serials (those aired prior to December 1947) used an excerpt from Scheherazade by Nikolai Rimsky-Korsakov. Repeats of some serials continued to be heard on the successor to the Home Service, Radio 4, during the 1980s, and as late as 1992 (when The Spencer Affair was repeated to celebrate Francis Durbridge's 80th birthday).

Many of the earliest serials, in which the eponymous hero was played by many actors, have not survived. Several were remade in the 1940s, in abridged form, as feature films. However, some of the early radio serials do still exist, including Paul Temple Intervenes from 1942, featuring the first appearance in the series by Westbury, in a supporting role. All but one of the serials starring Peter Coke also exist: since 2003, these have been regularly repeated on digital station BBC Radio 7 (now BBC Radio 4 Extra). In 2006, the station tracked down the then 93-year-old Coke for a half-hour interview programme, Peter Coke and the Paul Temple Affair, and the actor was also interviewed in 1998 for a half-hour documentary Send For Paul Temple, an episode in the series The Radio Detectives.

Because no recordings survive for many of the early serials, in 2006 BBC Radio 4 began recreating them, in as authentic a manner as possible: as mono productions, employing vintage microphones and sound effects, and using the original scripts. In all cases Crawford Logan starred as Paul Temple with Gerda Stevenson as Steve, in place of the original leads. The first of these broadcasts, in August 2006, was a new eight-part production of Paul Temple and the Sullivan Mystery, originally aired in 1947. A new production of The Madison Mystery, from 1949, aired between May and July 2008, followed by the 1947 serial Paul Temple and Steve in June and July 2010. A Case for Paul Temple, from 1946, was transmitted in August and September 2011. The final such production to date was Paul Temple and the Gregory Affair, aired in 2013 (the longest of all the serials, running to ten episodes). Many of these new productions featured Welsh actor Gareth Thomas as the head of Scotland Yard. Each of the new recordings was also released on CD.

Paul Temple's catchphrase, "by Timothy", first occurred in episode two of the first ever serial, Send for Paul Temple. As spoken by Kim Peacock in the 1940s serials, it made Temple sound like Wilfrid Hyde-White (it was a phrase Hyde-White frequently used, particularly in the BBC Radio series The Men from the Ministry). Interviewed in 2006, Peter Coke said he hated the phrase, because even in the 1950s he thought it sounded old-fashioned.

In 1998, on the death of author Francis Durbridge, the BBC broadcast a radio documentary about Paul Temple written and presented by Jeffrey Richards, entitled Send For Paul Temple (aired on 20 May 1998), which included extracts from surviving recordings held in the BBC Sound Archive such as the first ever serial in 1938.

List of radio serials

Film adaptations
Between 1946 and 1952, Paul Temple appeared in four feature films, each an abridged version of one of the early (hence, now lost) BBC radio serials. These films were distributed by Butcher's Film Service based in the North of England. All were made in the years before Peter Coke was cast as the definitive Paul Temple in the radio series in 1954. Marjorie Westbury had been established in the radio series by this point, but was not cast in these films because she was not a film actress.

 1946 Send for Paul Temple (abridged remake of the radio serial of the same name) with Anthony Hulme (1910–2007) (born Harry Idris Miller) as Temple, Joy Shelton as Steve and Maire O'Neill as Mrs Neddy.
 1948 Calling Paul Temple (abridged remake of radio serial Send for Paul Temple Again) with John Bentley as Temple and Dinah Sheridan as Steve.
 1950 Paul Temple's Triumph (abridged remake of radio serial News of Paul Temple) with John Bentley as Temple and Dinah Sheridan as Steve.
 1952 Paul Temple Returns (abridged remake of radio serial Paul Temple Intervenes) with John Bentley as Temple and Patricia Dainton as Steve. It was also released under the alternative title Bombay Waterfront.

BBC television series
Francis Durbridge licensed the television rights in his characters to the BBC, who between 1969 and 1971 produced a drama series entitled Paul Temple. It starred Francis Matthews as Paul Temple, and co-starred Ros Drinkwater as his wife Steve. None of the television scripts were written by Durbridge.

The 52 episodes, made over 4 seasons, were co-produced with ZDF, a West German television station based in Munich. This made it practicable, in terms of the show's budget, to film location scenes for the series overseas (i.e. in Munich and other cities in West Germany). The episodes were subsequently dubbed into German, using German voice artists, for broadcast by ZDF to German audiences.

Only 16 of the 52 episodes currently exist in the BBC's television archive with their original English soundtrack, and only 11 of these are in colour (for the other five, only black and white telerecordings survive). Seasons 2-4 survive, in colour, in archives in Germany, but with dubbed German soundtracks.

The theme tune of the television series was composed by Ron Grainer.

Novels
Many of the BBC Paul Temple radio serials were novelised between 1938 and 1989 by Francis Durbridge working with collaborators from his original scripts. The first was Send for Paul Temple (1938) with John Thewes. 'Thewes' is thought to have been a pseudonym for Charles Hatton, with whom Durbridge collaborated on the following four Temple novelisations up until 1948. All of these were rapidly adapted from the original scripts in order to capitalise on the popularity of the radio serial. Publicity for Send for Paul Temple described it as "the novel of the thriller that created a BBC fan-mail record". Durbridge used a co-author because he regarded himself as a writer of dialogue, a scriptwriter rather than a novelist. The two novels with Douglas Rutherford (The Tyler Mystery, 1957 and East of Algiers, 1959) appeared under the pen name 'Paul Temple'. The Tyler Mystery is unusual in giving Temple's wife Steve a more central role. East of Algiers was partly based on the 1947 radio serial Paul Temple and the Sullivan Mystery. From The Kelby Affair on the novels are credited to Francis Durbridge alone.

 Send for Paul Temple (1938) (with John Thewes, aka Charles Hatton?)
 Paul Temple and the Front Page Men (1939) (with Charles Hatton)
 News of Paul Temple (1940) (with Charles Hatton)
 Paul Temple Intervenes (1944) (with Charles Hatton)
 Send for Paul Temple Again! (1948) (with Charles Hatton)
 Paul Temple and the Tyler Mystery (1957) (with Douglas Rutherford)
 Paul Temple: East of Algiers (1959) (with Douglas Rutherford)
 Paul Temple and the Kelby Affair (1970)
 Paul Temple and the Harkdale Robbery (1970)
 Paul Temple and the Geneva Mystery (1971)
 Paul Temple and the Curzon Case (1972)
 Paul Temple and the Margo Mystery (1986)
 Paul Temple and the Madison Case (1988)
 Paul Temple and the Conrad Case (1989)

Newspaper strip
Between 19 November 1951 and 1 May 1971, whilst the character was at the height of his popularity on radio and television, Paul Temple was adapted as a daily newspaper strip in the London Evening News. The strip was written by (and credited in-page to) Francis Durbridge himself.

Until 1954 the strip was drawn by Alfred Sindall. From 1954 onward it was continued by Bill Bailey, John McNamara and Philip Mendoza. Selected editions from the strips drawn by John McNamara were reprinted by an obscure South London magazine publisher, Micron, in a short lived series in 1964. At no stage did the strip feature recognisable portraits of the then-current stars of the radio series, Peter Coke and Marjorie Westbury.

Commercial releases

All the surviving English-language radio episodes, including the 1940 Canadian remake of Send for Paul Temple, have been released on CD by the BBC.

The 11 surviving colour episodes held in the BBC archives (featuring Francis Matthews and Ros Drinkwater) from the BBC-TV version of "Paul Temple" were released on DVD on 6 July 2009 by Acorn Media UK. A further five black-and-white recordings (of originally colour episodes) were released in April 2012. All of Seasons 2-4 exist in Germany in various archives (principally in the archives of ZDF, the series' German co-producer) with soundtracks dubbed in German (just one, not existing at the BBC, survives in English). The German language versions have all been released on DVD in Germany by Fernsehjuwelen DVD.

In 2010 Renown Pictures Ltd, new owners of The Butchers Library, released on DVD the feature films Send For Paul Temple, Paul Temple Returns (a.k.a. Bombay Waterfront) and Calling Paul Temple.

During 2011–12 all four Paul Temple movies were released by Renown. A DVD box set of three was released in November 2011; the fourth film, Paul Temple's Triumph, was released singly, initially to Renown Club members only, in March 2012, but has since become generally available.

Starting in February 2016, all the surviving Paul Temple radio serials were released on CD across four new BBC box sets. These include the previously unreleased 1959 remake of Paul Temple and The Gilbert Case and the original 1950 Kim Peacock version of Paul Temple and The VanDyke Affair (the latter featuring Peter Coke in a supporting role) as well as the remakes made in the 21st century.

International adaptations

Netherlands

In the Netherlands, several of the radio plays were re-recorded using Dutch actors and the title character's name adapted as Paul Vlaanderen. Alfred Sindall drew the initial strips.

Germany
In Germany, twelve Paul Temple radio serials were adapted between 1949 and 1967, each episode (in common with the BBC serials) ending on a cliffhanger. They were listened to by such huge numbers of people that they earned the sobriquet Straßenfeger ("street sweepers"), because they left the streets practically deserted whenever an episode was broadcast. They were performed by actors of national renown, including Luxembourg-born René Deltgen (who played the title role in 11 of the 12 series), Gustav Knuth, Friedrich W Bauschulte, Pinkas Braun, Heinz Schimmelpfennig, Siegfried Wischnewski, Wolfgang Wahl, Günther Ungeheuer and Paul Klinger amongst others.

All 11 surviving German radio serials have since been released on CD as audiobooks. Two short-lived comic series by the Aachener Bildschriftenverlag and the Luna-Kriminalromane are rare collector's items.

In 2014, an abridged remake of the lost 1949 version of "Paul Temple and the Gregory Affair" was aired and released, followed by a live radio show in 2015 with the cast and the WDR Radio Orchestra, hosted by German Comedian Bastian Pastewka.

In 2015, all four Paul Temple feature films were released on DVD.

Italy
Seven Italian-language Paul Temple serials were produced by RAI between 1953 and 1977, each with a different voice actor in the title role:
 Paul Temple, il romanziere poliziotto (from A Case for Paul Temple), 1953 with Fernando Farese
 Paul Temple e il caso Gregory (from Paul Temple and the Gregory Affair), 1961 with Gualtiero Rizzi
 Paul Temple e l'Uomo di Zermatt (from Paul Temple and the Lawrence Affair), 1961 with Adolfo Geri
 Margò (from Paul Temple and the Margo Mystery), 1967 with Aroldo Tieri
 Chi è Jonathan? (from Paul Temple and the Jonathan Mystery), 1971 with Mario Feliciani
 La ragazza scomparsa (from Paul Temple and the Conrad Case), 1975 with Alberto Lupo
 Cabaret (from Paul Temple and the Spencer Affair), 1975 with Luigi Vannucchi

Both 1961 productions are presumed lost.

Notes

References

External links
 The Paul Temple File
Francis Durbridge Homepage: Paul Temple (Radio, TV, Books) (German)
Paul Temple
OGSPI OGS – Provincial Index – Ontario Ancestors Anthony Hulme Obituary
Paul Temple

British radio dramas
Detective radio shows
1938 radio programme debuts
1968 radio programme endings
Radio programs adapted into television shows
Radio programs adapted into novels
Radio programs adapted into comics
Radio programs adapted into films
Temple, Paul
Temple, Paul
Temple, Paul
Temple, Paul
Temple, Paul
Temple, Paul
Temple, Paul
Temple, Paul